Casa Casuarina, also known as the Versace Mansion, is an American property built in 1930, renowned for being owned by and the place of the murder of the Italian fashion designer Gianni Versace; he lived there from 1992 until his death in 1997. It is located at 1116 Ocean Drive in the South Beach neighborhood of Miami Beach, Florida, in the Miami Beach Architectural District. Since 2015, it has been adapted into and operates as a luxury boutique hotel known as The Villa Casa Casuarina.

History

Alden Freeman
Casa Casuarina was built in 1930 by Ronin Wolf in the Mediterranean Revival style for Alden Freeman (1862–1937), a philanthropist homosexual bachelor who was heir to a Standard Oil fortune. It is rumored that during construction, a time capsule was hidden in one of the walls.

Freeman said the structure was modeled on the Alcázar de Colón, with its Coralline rock blocks. A block from the Alcázar de Colón structure is located on the right side of the main entrance. Addison Mizner designed the interior, including the use of key lime coral flooring.

The name translates to "house of the Australian pine". Commentators suggest that it was named after a W. Somerset Maugham novel, Under the Casuarina Tree, or maybe refers to a tree on the lot that survived the 1926 Miami hurricane.

Major architecture features included an observatory and a small replica of the Homage Tower from the Fortaleza Ozama in the Dominican Republic. About 100 medallions of notable political figures, including Lenin, Mussolini, and Julius Caesar, are installed on the walls.

Freeman was the son of Joel Francis Freeman (1836–1910), who served as treasurer of Standard Oil. The younger Freeman lived in the house with his adopted son Charles Boulton and Boulton's family. He died at the house on December 29, 1937.

Amsterdam Palace
Jacques Amsterdam acquired the house for $100,000 and converted it into a 24-unit apartment building, naming it The Amsterdam Palace. It changed hands several times and was renamed as the Christopher Columbus Apartments, in commemoration of its architectural features referring to Mediterranean style.

Gianni Versace

Gianni Versace bought the house for $2.95 million in 1992. He restored the original name and returned it to private use, creating 8 bedrooms, 2 kitchens, 3 sitting rooms, 10 bathrooms, a bar, a library, and 4 living rooms. He installed modern systems, including central air conditioning. In 1993, Versace bought the adjoining Revere Hotel to the south for $3.7 million, which he tore down to make a pool and garden area for his house. Versace commissioned Sir Roy Strong, an English art historian and landscape designer, to work on creating the garden. He also had created gardens at Versace's Villa Fontanelle on Lake Como in Italy.

On July 15, 1997, Versace was shot dead in front of the house by Andrew Cunanan.

Post-Versace
In 2000, the mansion was purchased by Peter Loftin for $19 million. He renovated the property for use as a boutique hotel, restaurant, and luxury event space. The restaurant was Il Sole at The Villa Casa Casuarina.

The mansion was bought by VM South Beach LLC (owned by the Nakash family) for $41.5 million in 2013. Since 2015, The Villa Casa Casuarina has been a luxury hotel with ten unique suites. The gourmet restaurant Gianni's is housed there.

Gallery

References

External links

 

Miami Beach Architectural District
1930 establishments in Florida
Gardens by Roy Strong
Hotels in Miami Beach, Florida
Houses completed in 1930
Houses in Miami
Mediterranean Revival architecture
Versace